Ping-pong diplomacy refers to the exchange of table tennis (ping-pong) players between the United States (US) and People's Republic of China (PRC) in the early 1970s, that began during the 1971 World Table Tennis Championships in Nagoya, Japan as a result of an encounter between players Glenn Cowan (of the US) and Zhuang Zedong (of the PRC). The exchange and its promotion helped to humanize the people in each country after a period of isolation and distrust. It paved the way for President Richard Nixon's visit to Beijing in 1972, and is considered a turning point in relations between the United States and the People's Republic of China.

History

Background 
The United States viewed the People's Republic of China as an aggressor nation and enforced an economic containment policy including an embargo on the PRC, following its entry into the Korean War in 1950. After approximately 20 years of neither diplomatic nor economic relations, both countries finally saw an advantage in opening up to each other: China viewed closer relations with the United States as a beneficial counter to its increasingly tense relationship with the Soviet Union, which had seen the outbreak of a series of bloody border incidents, while the U.S. sought closer relations with China as leverage in its peace negotiations with North Vietnam.

"The thirty-first World Table Tennis Championships, held in Nagoya, Japan, provided an opportunity for both China and the United States."

Process 
The U.S. Table Tennis team was in Nagoya, Japan in 1971 for the 31st World Table Tennis Championships on April 6 when they received an invitation to visit China. From the early years of the People's Republic, sports had played an important role in diplomacy, often incorporating the slogan "Friendship First, Competition Second". During the isolationist years, athletes were among the few PRC nationals who were allowed to travel overseas. On April 10, 1971, the team and accompanying journalists became the first American delegation to set foot in the Chinese capital since 1949. The meeting was facilitated by the National Committee on United States – China Relations. Prior to the visit by the American table tennis players, eleven Americans were admitted into the PRC for one week because they all professed affiliation with the Black Panther Party, which followed a Maoist political line. This was unusual, given that high-profile American citizens such as Senator Eugene McCarthy expressed interest in visiting China after the 1968 presidential election, but even he could not have a trip arranged for him despite his office.

According to History of U.S. Table Tennis by Tim Boggan, who went to China along with the U.S. Table Tennis Team, three incidents may have triggered their invitation from China. Welshman H. Roy Evans, then President of the International Table Tennis Federation, claimed that he visited China prior to the 31st World Table Tennis Championship and suggested to non-Chinese sports authorities and Premier Zhou Enlai that China should take steps to get in contact with the world through international sport events after the Cultural Revolution. Furthermore, the American player Leah "Miss Ping" Neuberger, the 1956 World Mixed Doubles Champion and nine-time U.S. Open Women's Singles Champion, was traveling at the time with the Canadian Table Tennis Team that had been invited by China to visit the country. China diplomatically extended its approval of Leah Neuberger's application for a visa to the entire American team. The third incident, perhaps the most likely trigger, was the unexpected but dramatic meeting between the flamboyant American player Glenn Cowan and the Chinese player Zhuang Zedong, a three-time world champion and winner of many other table tennis events. Zhuang Zedong described the incident in a 2007 talk at the USC U.S.-China Institute.

The events leading up to the encounter began when Glenn Cowan missed his team bus one afternoon after his practice in Nagoya during the 31st World Table Tennis Championship. Cowan had been practicing for 15 minutes with the Chinese player, Liang Geliang, when a Japanese official came and wanted to close the training area. Cowan boarded a shuttle bus carrying the Chinese team, most of whom treated him with suspicion. Chinese player Zhuang Zedong, however, shook Cowan's hand, spoke to him through an interpreter and presented him with a silk-screen portrait of Huangshan Mountains, a famous product from Hangzhou. Cowan wanted to give something back, but all he could find from his bag was a comb. The American hesitantly replied, "I can't give you a comb. I wish I could give you something, but I can't." This World Table Tennis Championships marked the return of China's participation after a six-year absence. When the Chinese team and Cowan walked off the bus, journalists who were following the Chinese team took photographs. In the political climate of the 1960s, the sight of an athlete of Communist China with an athlete of the United States was sure to garner attention. As a self-described hippie, Cowan presented Zhuang with a T-shirt with a red, white and blue peace emblem flag and the words "Let It Be," lyrics from a song by The Beatles, on the following day.

When a journalist asked Cowan, "Mr. Cowan, would you like to visit China?", he answered, "Well, I'd like to see any country I haven't seen before--Argentina, Australia, China, ... Any country I haven't seen before." "But what about China in particular? Would you like to go there?" "Of course," said Glenn Cowan.

During an interview in 2002 with the famous TV personality Chen Luyu, Zhuang Zedong told more of the story: "The trip on the bus took 15 minutes, and I hesitated for 10 minutes. I grew up with the slogan 'Down with the American imperialism!' And during the Cultural Revolution, the string of class struggle was tightened unprecedentedly, and I was asking myself, 'Is it okay to have anything to do with your No. 1 enemy?'" Zhuang recalled remembering that Chairman Mao Zedong met Edgar Snow on the Rostrum of Tiananmen on the National Day in 1970 and said to Snow that China should now place its hope on American people.
Zhuang looked in his bag and first went through some pins, badges with Mao's head, silk handkerchiefs, and fans. But he felt these were not decent enough to be a good gift. He finally picked the silk portrait of Huangshan Mountains. On the following day, many Japanese newspapers carried photographs of Zhuang Zedong and Glenn Cowan.

When the Chinese Department of Foreign Affairs received a report that the U.S. Table Tennis Team hoped to get invited to visit China, the department declined as usual. Zhou Enlai and Mao Zedong initially agreed with the decision, but when Mao Zedong saw the news with Cowan in Reference News, an internal newspaper accessible only to high-ranking government officials, he decided to invite the U.S. Table Tennis Team. It was reported that Mao Zedong said, "This Zhuang Zedong not only plays table tennis well, but is good at foreign affairs, and he has a mind for politics." On April 10, 1971, nine American players, four officials, and two spouses stepped across a bridge from Hong Kong to the Chinese mainland and then spent their time during April 11–17 playing fun matches, touring the Great Wall and Summer Palace, and watching a ballet.

Reactions
Upon his return to the United States, one of the American players told reporters that the Chinese were very similar to people in the U.S. He said:

The people are just like us. They are real, they're genuine, they got feeling. I made friends, I made genuine friends, you see. The country is similar to America, but still very different. It's beautiful. They got the Great Wall, they got plains over there. They got an ancient palace, the parks, there's streams, and they got ghosts that haunt; there's all kinds of, you know, animals. The country changes from the south to the north. The people, they have a, a unity. They really believe in their Maoism.

Ping-pong diplomacy was successful and resulted in opening the U.S.-PRC relationship, leading the U.S. to lift the embargo against China on June 10, 1971. On February 28, 1972, during President Nixon and Henry Kissinger's visit to Shanghai, the Shanghai Communiqué was issued between the U.S. and the PRC. The Communiqué noted that both nations would work towards the normalization of their relations.

The response to Nixon's visit

Two months after Richard Nixon's visit, Zhuang Zedong visited the U.S. as the head of a Chinese table-tennis delegation, April 12–30, 1972. Notably, the Chinese delegation played a team of University of Maryland, College Park students at the university's Cole Field House on April 17, 1972. The president's daughter Tricia Nixon Cox was in the stands. Also on the itinerary were Canada, Mexico and Peru. Efforts to employ "ping-pong diplomacy" were not always successful, such as when the All Indonesia Table Tennis Association (PTMSI) refused China's invitation in October 1971, claiming that accepting the PRC's offer would improve the PRC's reputation. Because neither Soviet athletes nor journalists appeared in China following the appearance of the American players and journalists, one speculation is that the act showed the equal scorn of both countries towards the USSR.

1991 united Korean Team 
Another example of Ping Pong Diplomacy occurred during the 1991 World Table Tennis Championships in Chiba, Japan, where a unified Korean team played together for the first time since the Korean War.

The diplomatic efforts leading to the formation of this unified team were led by then-International Table Tennis Federation President, Ichiro Ogimura.

Prior to the championships, Ogimura visited South Korea 20 times and traveled to North Korea 15 times to plead for a unified team from the Korean peninsula. Ogimura also worked with local Japanese government heads to create joint training camps in the cities of Nagano, Nagaoka and Chiba, and secured agreement from the ITTF for North Korea and South Korea to compete under the unified name of “Korea”.

The Korean team played under a white flag depicting the Korean peninsula in blue and used the Korean folksong, Arirang, rather than the national anthem of either the North or the South.

The competition saw the Korean team win one gold medal, one silver and two bronze medals.

This action has since been repeated. At the 2018 World Team Table Tennis Championships, the two Koreas entered separate teams in the competition but, when they were paired against each other at the quarter-final of the women's event, they negotiated instead to field a joint team for the semi-final.

Legacy
In 1988, table tennis became an Olympic sport.
Ping-pong diplomacy was referenced in the 1994 film Forrest Gump. After suffering injuries in battle, Forrest develops an aptitude for the sport and joins the U.S. Army team—eventually competing against Chinese teams on a goodwill tour.
During the week of July 8, 2011, a three-day ping-pong diplomacy event was held at the Richard Nixon Presidential Library and Museum in Yorba Linda, California. Original members of both the Chinese and American ping-pong teams from 1971 were present and competed again.

See also

1999 Baltimore Orioles – Cuban national baseball team exhibition series
2008 New York Philharmonic visit to North Korea
Summit Series
Panda diplomacy

References

 Boggan, Tim. History of U.S. Table Tennis

Further reading

"Talking Points" (USC US-China Newsletter), July 22, 2011, looks at the fortieth anniversary of ping-pong diplomacy, notes that the term was first used in 1901, and discusses how it was a bold bit of public diplomacy on China's part while China and the United States were engaged in back channel discussions.
Griffin, Nicholas (2014) Ping-Pong Diplomacy: The Secret History Behind the Game That Changed the World. Simon & Schuster. 

Mathews, Jay. "The Strange Tale of American Attempts to Leap the Wall of China". The New York Times, 18 April 1971.
Schwartz, Harry. "Triangular Politics and China". The New York Times, 19 April 1971: 37.
 Wang Guanhua, "'Friendship First': China's Sports Diplomacy in the Cold War Era", Journal of American-East Asian Relations 12.3-4 (Fall-Winter 2003): 133–153.
 Xu Guoqi, "The Sport of Ping-Pong Diplomacy", Ch. Five, in Olympic Dreams: China and Sports 1895-2008 (Cambridge, MA: Harvard University Press, 2008 ), pp. 117–163.

External links
Zhuang Zedong 2007 talk about the 1971 encounter
 PBS article
 Smithsonian Magazine article
New round of ping pong diplomacy (The Guardian, Tuesday, June 10, 2008)

China–United States relations
International relations
Types of diplomacy
Politics and sports
Table tennis in China
1971 in China
1971 in table tennis
Chinese foreign policy